Pepper golden mosaic virus is a plant pathogenic virus of the family Geminiviridae. It affects Capsicum annuum and all tomatoes. It was first discovered in Texas in 1987, and was called Texas Pepper Virus, and a two years later in Mexico after it destroyed up to 100% of plants in afflicted fields in the autumn of 1989, mainly in north-west Mexico.

References

External links
ICTVdB - The Universal Virus Database: Serrano golden mosaic virus

Begomovirus
Viral plant pathogens and diseases